The 1996 Goody's Headache Powder 500 was the 22nd stock car race of the 1996 NASCAR Winston Cup Series and the 36th iteration of the event. The race was held on Saturday, August 24, 1996, in Bristol, Tennessee at Bristol Motor Speedway, a 0.533 miles (0.858 km) permanent oval-shaped racetrack. The race took the scheduled 500 laps to complete. At race's end, Penske Racing South driver Rusty Wallace would manage to dominate a majority of the race to take his 46th career NASCAR Winston Cup Series victory and his fifth and final victory of the season. To fill out the top three, Hendrick Motorsports driver Jeff Gordon and Roush Racing driver Mark Martin would finish second and third, respectively.

Background 

The Bristol Motor Speedway, formerly known as Bristol International Raceway and Bristol Raceway, is a NASCAR short track venue located in Bristol, Tennessee. Constructed in 1960, it held its first NASCAR race on July 30, 1961. Despite its short length, Bristol is among the most popular tracks on the NASCAR schedule because of its distinct features, which include extraordinarily steep banking, an all concrete surface, two pit roads, and stadium-like seating. It has also been named one of the loudest NASCAR tracks.

Entry list 

 (R) denotes rookie driver.

*Replaced by Bobby Hillin Jr. for the race due to complications from injuries suffered at the 1996 Winston Select 500.

Qualifying 
Qualifying was split into two rounds. The first round was held on Friday, August 23, at 5:30 PM EST. Each driver would have one lap to set a time. During the first round, the top 25 drivers in the round would be guaranteed a starting spot in the race. If a driver was not able to guarantee a spot in the first round, they had the option to scrub their time from the first round and try and run a faster lap time in a second round qualifying run, held on Saturday, August 34, at 12:30 PM EST. As with the first round, each driver would have one lap to set a time. For this specific race, positions 26-34 would be decided on time, and depending on who needed it, a select amount of positions were given to cars who had not otherwise qualified but were high enough in owner's points.

Bobby Hillin Jr. was the only driver to fail to qualify.

Full qualifying results

Race results

References 

1996 NASCAR Winston Cup Series
NASCAR races at Bristol Motor Speedway
August 1996 sports events in the United States
1996 in sports in Tennessee